Allt du önskar ("Everything You Wish") was the 2011 edition of Sveriges Radio's Christmas Calendar.

Plot
11 years old girl Elvira moves into the Lancelot family some weeks before Christmas. There, she get what she wants, but soon learns that something isn't alright.

References
 

2011 radio programme debuts
2011 radio programme endings
Sveriges Radio's Christmas Calendar